Thiotricha epiclista is a moth of the family Gelechiidae. It was described by Edward Meyrick in 1908. It is found in Assam, India.

The wingspan is about 9 mm. The forewings are shining dark grey with an orange patch occupying the apical third of the wing, not reaching the margins except at the apex and tornus, enclosing a wedge-shaped blackish terminal streak, and with its anterior end indented by an acute triangular projection of ground colour. There is a blackish streak crossing this patch from near the lower anterior angle almost to the apex, and a blackish longitudinal dash above this. Three white dots are found on the costa posteriorly, and there is a black apical dot, as well as some indistinct whitish dots or strigulae on the dorsum posteriorly and at the termen. The hindwings are rather dark grey.

References

Moths described in 1908
Thiotricha
Taxa named by Edward Meyrick